Gunther Paul Barth (1925 in Düsseldorf – January 7, 2004 in Berkeley) was an American historian. Barth joined the University of California, Berkeley faculty in 1962, and taught Western American and urban history until his retirement in 1995. During his career, he reached the position of professor of history.

Early life
Gunther Barth was born in 1925 in Düsseldorf, Germany. He attended local schools in Düsseldorf until he was 16 years of age, after which World War II was well underway, and he was drafted into the military. He fought on several fronts, was wounded twice, and captured by British forces.

After the war, and out of the army, he worked as a journalist in Düsseldorf until 1951. During two of those years he studied literature and art history at the University of Cologne; he also won a year-long fellowship, awarded by the U.S. State Department, which enabled him to study at the University of Oregon. After another year in Cologne, he returned to the United States, worked in New York City in construction and, for a short time, as a nightclub bouncer. By 1957, armed with an A.B. and an M.A. from the University of Oregon, he felt ready for doctoral work in history and entered Harvard University. Studying for five years, Barth was awarded a Ph.D. for his work in 1962.

Career

Barth not only won acclaim for his books but he also became famous as an academic teacher who impressed his students with his stupendous memory and his dry humor. Twice he was a Fulbright professor at the University of Cologne and once at the University of Hamburg in Germany.

Death
Barth died on January 7, 2004, in Berkeley, California.

Works
 Bitter Strength: A History of the Chinese in the United States, 1964
 Instant Cities, 1975
 City People, 1980
 Fleeting Moments, 1990

External links
 Biography at UC Berkeley

20th-century American historians
American male non-fiction writers
University of Oregon alumni
Harvard School of Engineering and Applied Sciences alumni
University of California, Berkeley College of Letters and Science faculty
2004 deaths
1925 births
Writers from Düsseldorf
German emigrants to the United States
20th-century American male writers
Historians from California